Langhorne Creek  may refer to:

Langhorne Creek, South Australia
Langhorne Creek wine region